The Rover 400 Series, and later the Rover 45, are a series of small family cars that were produced by the British manufacturer Rover from 1990 to 2005. The cars were co-developed as part of Rover's collaboration with Honda. The first-generation 400 was based on the Honda Concerto, and the Mark II 400 (later the Rover 45) was based on the Honda Domani/Civic. 

Honda petrol engines were used in some Rover models, while the market competitive Rover L-series diesel engine was used from the mid-1990s in Hondas, before they designed their own diesel engine.

Rover 400 (R8; 1990–1998)

The original 400 Series, launched in 1990 as a four-door saloon, was a saloon version of the second-generation Rover 200 Series hatchback, both sharing the codename R8 during development. The 200 Series had been launched six months earlier. Like the 200, the model was designed in collaboration with Honda (who produced the corresponding designed for Europe Concerto model) and both models would share production lines at Rover's Longbridge facility. It used the same core structure and mechanicals as the Honda, but the rear-end redesign of the glasshouse and body were unique to Rover. Interior trim and electrical architecture were all shared with the R8 Rover 200.

An estate — or station wagon — version was subsequently developed by Rover Special Products. Badged as the Rover 400 Tourer, this remained in production alongside the second-generation 400 until 1998, as no estate version of the latter car was built. Many of the 400 Tourers were exported to Japan.

The R8 Rover 200 and 400 were the first applications of Rover's K-series family of engines (appearing in 1.4 L (1,396 cc) twin-cam 16-valve form). 

The 1.6 L (1,590 cc) version used either a Honda D16A6 and D16Z2 SOHC or D16A8 DOHC powerplant, while the 2.0 L M-series unit from the 800 Series followed soon afterwards (1991) in the sportier versions. 

The Rover-engined models drove the front wheels via jointly developed Peugeot/Rover R65 gearboxes (1.4 litre) and Rover PG1 for the 1.6- and 2.0-litre versions. The Rover 420 GSI turbo and GSI Sport turbo, produced in limited numbers, were equipped with the turbocharged 197 bhp (147 kW) Rover T-series engine. Also available were two PSA (non-electronically controlled Lucas CAV injection pumps) Indirect injection diesel engines, with the choice of naturally aspirated 1.9-litre XUD9 or turbocharged 1.8 XUD7T engines.

These engines were installed instead of the non-electronically controlled Bosch HPVE Direct Injection Rover MDi / Perkins Prima used in the Austin Maestro and Montego, as that engine, with its noisy combustion but lower fuel consumption, was deemed too unrefined for the new models.

A mid-life facelift (also applied to the Rover 200) saw the reintroduction of the Rover grille, which had reappeared on the R17 facelift of the Rover 800. This change was achieved without significant change to the remaining structure, but provided a more distinctive Rover "family look" and established a certain distance from the Honda Concerto.

Rover 400 (HH-R; 1995–1999)

The second-generation 400 Series, codenamed Theta or HH-R, was launched in 1995 as a hatchback and later as a saloon. It was based on the Honda Domani, which had been released in Japan in 1992, and was sold as part of the European Honda Civic range in five-door hatchback form. It was no longer as closely related to the 200 Series, which was revised independently by Rover but still shared many components with the 400.  It would prove to be the final collaborative model between Rover and Honda, ending a partnership that had begun with the Triumph Acclaim in 1981.

Power came from 1.4- and 1.6-litre K-series, 1.6-litre Honda D-series SOHC (automatic gearbox only), and 2.0-litre Rover T-series petrol engines, as well as a 2.0-litre L-series turbodiesel borrowed from the larger 600 Series.

The Rover 400 might have been marketed as a small family car, as it compared closely in size and engine range with contemporary models such as the Ford Escort and Vauxhall Astra. Instead, Rover priced the car to compete with vehicles like the Ford Mondeo and Vauxhall Vectra. This was because Rover's only offering in the C/D segment at the time was the ageing Montego, and this gap in the company's line-up needed to be filled. A saloon version was later introduced for the 400. 

The related Honda Civic was not sold as a saloon in the UK, although a four-door version was available in other markets. This helped to expand the appeal of the Rover model into the executive car segment, and to better differentiate the two cars. 

The second-generation 400 was initially popular, being one of Britain's best-selling cars between 1995 and 1997. However, within three years it was being outsold by traditionally poorer-selling cars, such as the Volkswagen Passat and Renault Laguna.

Rover 45 (1999–2005)

The Rover 400 was given a facelift in 1999, becoming the Rover 45. It was repositioned and priced to compete with the Ford Focus and Vauxhall Astra, rather than larger cars like the Ford Mondeo and Vauxhall Vectra. From 2001, a re-engineered hot hatch version of the Rover 45 was launched and sold as the MG ZS.

The 1.4- and 1.6-litre K series petrol and 2.0-litre L series diesel engines were carried over from the 400 Series, along with the introduction of a 1.8 K series and a 2.0-litre V6 from the larger Rover 75 (replacing the 2.0 T series four-cylinder petrol unit) – although this power unit was only available on saloon versions. The 45 came equipped with the better seating of the 75 and whilst the 400 models handled very well, the suspension was tuned to give much better controlled ride characteristics with quicker steering.

The 45 was available with Continuously Variable Transmission (CVT) supplied by the German manufacturer ZF Sachs AG which had previously been used in the MGF. This particular design of CVT consists of an oil cooled laminated steel belt (with external oil cooler) running on variable pulleys. The revised model boasted improved equipment levels, comfortable interior and reduced prices, compared with the preceding 400 badged models. While the asking price was now in line with other small family cars, the Rover 45 began to lose market share, its chances of success not helped by its aged design. Therefore, the 45 was never able to seriously compete with more modern designs, such as the Ford Focus and Vauxhall Astra in terms of popularity. It was also outsold by the likes of the Peugeot 307, Fiat Stilo, Volkswagen Golf and Renault Mégane.

A 2004 facelift was MG Rover's last effort to boost sales of the Rover 45, with a new front and rear-end styling, a redesigned interior with refreshed dash, centre console and new switchgear, revised suspension settings, improved equipment and lower prices. Some of these changes were necessitated by the end of Domani production in Japan, as Honda refused to continue the supply of certain parts. 

Production of the car stopped in April 2005, due to MG Rover's bankruptcy. Honda swiftly terminated the licensing agreement with MG Rover, and removed the remaining tooling and assembly lines for the car from Longbridge prior to its sale to Nanjing Automotive, which meant that no versions of the Rover 45/MG ZS were ever produced by Nanjing Automotive.

Security Ratings
Rover 45 models were tested on three occasions by Thatcham's New Vehicle Security Ratings (NVSR) organisation, and achieved the following ratings:

Powertrain
These were the engines available for the Rover 400 (1995–1999) and Rover 45 (2000–2005):

Replacement model projects

R30
During the end of the 1990s, replacements for the Rover 25 and 45 models were developed by Rover Group under the codename R30. Intended for launch in 2003 as the Rover 35 and 55, these would have been based on an all new platform. At launch, these would have used K-series engines, but new Valvetronic engines were anticipated to be introduced by 2006. The R30 Project was cancelled, when BMW divested its ownership of Rover Group in March 2000. 

It is possible that some of the development work may eventually have benefited the BMW 1 Series.

RD/X60
Following the termination of the R30 Project, from 2001, MG Rover planned to replace the 45 with a model range based on the Rover 75 platform. Collectively referred to as the RD/X60 project (sometimes also written RDX60), the range was intended to comprise the following variants:
RD60: Rover hatchback
X60: MG hatchback
RD61: Rover saloon
RD62: Rover "tourer" estate

A preview of how the RD62 "Tourer" might appear was given at the 2002 Geneva Motor Show in the form of the Rover TCV (Tourer Concept Vehicle) concept car.

During the design process, MG Rover's design partner Tom Walkinshaw Racing (TWR) went into administration. MG Rover lost access to most of the computer aided design work for their new vehicle. Efforts were made to reclaim these from the administrators, however, the resulting uncertainty and delays made it impossible to progress with the project.

The abortive SAIC Deal of August 2004 was to have included bringing a replacement for the ageing 45 to market, and the RD/X60 was a likely candidate for this. Ultimately, no such joint venture was entered into. After MG Rover's collapse, SAIC bought some of the company's intellectual property, and released a concept called the Roewe W2. Like the RD/X60, this was partly based on the platform of the Rover 75. The W2 entered production in April 2008, as the Roewe 550. 

A hatchback derivative of the 550 was announced in November 2009, as the MG6.

References

400
Compact cars
Front-wheel-drive vehicles
Hatchbacks
Sedans
Station wagons
2000s cars
Cars introduced in 1990
Cars discontinued in 2005